Gatibu is a Basque rock band from Gernika-Lumo, Biscay, northern Spain. Its name "Gatibu" means 'captive' in Basque. The group was formed around Alex Sardui, former lead vocalist of Exkixu, in summer 2002.

Gatibu is a Basque language band singing largely in the Biscayan dialect. This defense of Biscayan Basque has earned them numerous awards and praise from both institutions and cultural associations.

The band's first album was released in 2002 under the title Zoramena ('madness'). The album was recorded with the label Oihuka in the studio of Iñaki 'Uoho' Antón (Extremoduro and Platero y Tú) located in Muxika (Biscay). Their first album was a great success thanks to tracks like Musturrek sartunde (Putting the hills), earning them public acclaim across the Basque Country and landing the Egaztea award for the best song of 2003. The album featured a collaboration with Fito Cabrales (from Platero y Tú and Fito & Fitipaldis) and Roberto Iniesta (singer of Extremoduro), exceptionally singing songs in Basque.

In 2005, their second studio album was released, Disko Infernu ("Infernal Disco"), featuring songs like Inpernuaren ate joka (knocking on hell's door) or Gogoratzen zaitut (I remember you).

The band tours around local and other topic specific festivals of the Basque Country.

Awards and nominations
Winner.
Egaztea 2003.
Best Song, "Musturrek Sartunde".

Nomination.
Egaztea 2006.
Best Live, "Disko Infernu Tour".

Winner.
2006.
Bertsolaris Association of Getxo (Biscay).

Winner.
Egaztea 2009.
Best song, "Bang-Bang Txik-Txiki Bang Bang".

Winner.
Egaztea 2009.
Best album, "Laino Guztien Gainetik, Sasi Guztien Azpitik".

Members
 Alex Sardui - Voice
 Haimar Arejita - Electric and Acoustic Guitar
 Mikel Caballero - Bass
 Gaizka Salazar - Drum

Other members of the Lives 
Iñigo San Anton - Rhythm guitar (2002 - 2009, continuously). 
Iñigo Ibarretxe - Alboka (2002–Present, sporadically). 
Luis Camino - Txalaparta, Goblet drum, Udu, Congas (2005, presentation "Disko Infernu Tour"). 
José Alberto Batiz - Rhythm guitar, Slide guitar (2005 - 2006, continuously). 
Cristian Daniel de Resita - Voice (2005–Present, sporadically).
Jon Calvo - Rhythm guitar (2009 - 2010, continuously). 
Arkaitz Ortuzar - Rhythm guitar (2011 - 2016, continuously).

Discography 
* Zoramena (Oihuka, 2002)

* Disko Infernu (Oihuka, 2005)

* Laino Guztien Gainetik, Sasi Guztien Azpitik (Baga-Biga, 2008)

* Zuzenean Bizitzeko Gogoa (2010)

* Euritan dantzan (2014)

* Aske Maitte, Aske Bizi (2016)

* Azken Indioak (2018)

References

External links 

 Official Website

Basque music
Spanish rock music groups
Musical groups established in 2000